USRC Jefferson Davis was a United States Revenue Cutter Service topsail schooner of the Cushing class built in 1853. She was named for Jefferson Davis, then United States Secretary of War under President Franklin Pierce, and later president of the Confederate States of America.

Construction
The ship, a topsail schooner, was built by J.M. Hood of Bristol, Rhode Island for US$9,000.
 One online Coast Guard source describes her as a 90-plus foot (27-plus meter) vessel with  displacement; exhibit text at the Coast Guard Museum/Northwest describes her as a  vessel with  displacement,  beam, and  draft, with six  guns.

History
After surviving a hurricane in 1853 with slight damage, the ship put into Charleston, South Carolina for repairs, then sailed to around Cape Horn and arrived at San Francisco in July 1854 to serve on the West Coast. Continuing up the coast to arrive in Port Townsend, Washington September 28, 1854, Jefferson Davis became the first cutter stationed north of San Francisco.

Under Captain William C. Pease, Jefferson Davis participated in the suppression of a Native American uprising in Olympia, Washington in 1855, during the Puget Sound War. Later, in Bellingham, Washington, the entire crew except for the captain deserted to join the Fraser Canyon Gold Rush. One Coast Guard source says Jefferson Davis was converted to a "Marine Hospital Boat" in 1862; however, other sources (including exhibit text in the Coast Guard Museum/Northwest) say that it was sold that year to Grennan & Craney Co. of Utsalady, Washington for US$2920. According to one of the latter sources, Grennan & Craney Co. "refitted and sent her to China, carrying as cargo a flat-bottomed sternwheeler, which was to be supplied with the engines from Tom Wright's old Enterprise, dismantled on the Chehalis."

Coupeville, Washington, on Whidbey Island was named for Captain Thomas Coupe, once Jefferson Daviss sailing master.

References
Notes

Bibliography

External links
 Coast Guard Museum Northwest/USCG Base Seattle website
 E. W. Wright, Puget Sound Steamboats, Golden Days of Fraser River Navigation, Lewis & Dryden's Marine History of the Pacific Northwest. New York: Antiquarian Press, Ltd., 1961., Quoted online at Magellan Ship Biographies, accessed 2009-09-24.

Ships of the United States Revenue Cutter Service
Schooners of the United States
1853 ships
Ships built in Bristol, Rhode Island